Stadio Miramare is a multi-use stadium in Manfredonia, Italy. It is currently used mostly for football matches and is the home ground of Manfredonia Calcio. The stadium holds 4,076 spectators.

Manfredonia Calcio
Miramare
Manfredonia
Sports venues in Apulia